Sparkle is a lemon-flavored soft drink that was created by the Coca-Cola Company for the islands of Luzon, Visayas and Mindanao in the Philippines which successfully competed with Mountain Dew as it has a very similar taste. Sparkle is sold in many stores in the Philippines and is a very popular kids drink.

References

Coca-Cola brands
Lemon sodas